Chippin' Away is the fifth studio album of American country music singer Kevin Fowler. It was released on August 9, 2011.

Track listing

Chart performance

Album

Singles

References

http://www.cmt.com/artists/az/fowler_kevin/2718571/album.jhtml
http://tasteofcountry.com/kevin-fowler-chippin-away/
http://www.musicnewsnashville.com/kevin-fowler-%E2%80%93-chippin%E2%80%99-away

2011 albums
Kevin Fowler albums
Average Joes Entertainment albums